Palicourea fuchsioides is a species of plant in the family Rubiaceae. It is endemic to Ecuador.

References

Flora of Ecuador
fuchsioides
Taxonomy articles created by Polbot